The 2022 Winter Olympics was held in Beijing, China, between 4–20 February 2022. The Games officially opened on 4 February with preliminary events beginning on 2 February.

{|id="toc" class="toc" summary="Contents"
|align="center" colspan="3"|Contents
|-
|
Alpine skiing
Biathlon
Bobsleigh
Cross-country skiing
Curling
|valign=top|
Figure skating
Freestyle skiing
Ice hockey
Luge
Nordic combined
|valign=top|
Short track speed skating
Skeleton
Ski jumping
Snowboarding
Speed skating
|-
|align=center colspan=3|See also   References
|}


Alpine skiing

Men's events

Women's events

Team event

Biathlon

Men's events

Women's events

Mixed event

Bobsleigh

Cross-country skiing

Men's events

Women's events

Curling

Figure skating

 Skaters who only competed in the short program/rhythm dance.
 Skaters who only competed in the free skating/dance.

Freestyle skiing

Men's events

Women's events

Mixed team event

Ice hockey

Luge

Nordic combined

Short track speed skating

Men's events

Women's events

Mixed event

 Skaters who did not participate in the final, but received medals.

Skeleton

Ski jumping

Snowboarding

Men's events

Women's events

Mixed event

Speed skating

Men's events

Women's events

See also
 2022 Winter Olympics medal table

References

External links

Medal winners
Lists of Winter Olympic medalists by year
Medalists at the 2022 Winter Olympics